The 1921 Calgary municipal election was held on December 15, 1921 to elect six aldermen to sit on Calgary City Council. Additionally a commissioner, four members for the public school board and three members for the separate school board. The Mayor Samuel Hunter Adams was acclaimed.

There were twelve aldermen on city council, but six of the positions were already filled: Fred J. White, John Sidney Arnold, John Hugill, Charles Stevenson, Walter Little and Alexander McTaggart, were all elected to two-year terms in 1920 and were still in office.

A number of plebiscites were held, all requiring a two-thirds majority to pass. The only successful plebiscite reduced the number of commissioners election from three including the mayor, to two including the major.

The election was held under the Single Transferable Voting/Proportional Representation (STV/PR) with the term for candidates being two years.

A number of women were refused ballots during the 1921 election, the Calgary Daily Herald estimated a total of 1,000 to 1,500 women were refused votes. Women were refused who were not on the voting list, and many women assumed they would be on the voting list due to being registered for the 1920 Calgary municipal election.

Results

Council

Full Names and affiliations of unsuccessful candidates not available.

Commissioner

Public School Board

Separate School Board

Political affiliations are not available.

Plebiscites
All plebiscites required a two-thirds majority to pass. Only the reduction in number of commissioners plebiscite passed.

Reduce number of commissioners
Plebiscite to reduce number of commissioners from three, including the mayor, to two including the mayor. - Passed

Hospital Expenditure
Plebiscite to capitalize $71,381.61 of hospital expenditure and place it in previous $155,000 bylaw. - Defeated

Victoria Park Bath House
Plebiscite to build public bath house in Victoria Park with $30,000 borrowed from electric light fund. - Defeated

Sewer Connection Bylaw
Bylaw for sewer connections, $25,000. - Defeated

Water Connection Bylaw
Bylaw for water connections, $25,000. - Defeated

See also
List of Calgary municipal elections

References

1920s in Calgary
Municipal elections in Calgary
1921 elections in Canada